The Red Zinger Bicycle Classic (1975–1979) was a road bicycle racing stage race.

History
In 1975, Mo Siegel and John and Wyck Hay, founders of the Celestial Seasonings herbal tea company, launched the Red Zinger Bicycle Classic race to promote alternative transportation in the Greater Boulder area, particularly bike lanes, bike paths, and community awareness. The Classic was named after their popular Red Zinger tea.

In 1979, Michael Aisner, the race's then PR director, bought the race for one dollar from Siegel, and with his blessing took the idea of a grander event to Peter Coors, the beer impresario.
Over the next 8 years, the Coors International Bicycle Classic grew into two weeks of racing in California, Nevada and Colorado, with stages in some years in Hawaii and Wyoming.

From 1981-1992 a youth bicycling series called the Red Zinger Mini Classics was held in Colorado, its name inspired by the original Red Zinger Bicycle Classic, inspiring a generation of young cyclists to enter the sport.

Winners
 1975 - John Howard , Hannah North 
 1976 - John Howard , (no women's division)
 1977 - Wayne Stetina , Connie Carpenter 
 1978 - George Mount , Keetie van Oosten-Hage 
 1979 - Dale Stetina , Keetie van Oosten-Hage

Notes

Cycle races in the United States
Defunct cycling races in the United States
Recurring sporting events disestablished in 1978
Recurring sporting events established in 1975
1975 establishments in Colorado
Men's road bicycle races
Women's road bicycle races
1978 disestablishments in Colorado